Gemma Khalid (alternately Jamuna or Jemma Halid) is a Russian singer active since the 1990s.

References

External links 
Gemma Halid website

Russian women singer-songwriters
Singers from Moscow
1962 births
Living people